Tolleshunt Knights is a village and civil parish in the English county of Essex.

The Parish has a Parish council, and lies within the area of Maldon District Council. It borders Tiptree, Layer Marney and Salcott cum Virley within the Colchester Borough Council's District and Tolleshunt D'Arcy also within Maldon District. Prior to Tiptree Parish Council being established in 1934 much of the Tiptree Heath area was within the boundaries of Tolleshunt Knights.

The village is also the location of the Patriarchal Stavropegic Monastery of St. John the Baptist, an Orthodox monastery founded by Archimandrite Sophrony in 1958.

From 1904 to 1951 the village was served by a small station on the Kelvedon and Tollesbury Light Railway.

Tolleshunt Knights also has a village hall.

Notables residents of Tolleshunt Knights include the Cottee Family who have inhabited the small village and it’s neighbouring village, Tiptree, for over 400 years. They finally decided to settle in the village after leaving the Kingdom of France, they later decided to Anglicise their surname to the more English sounding Cottee from the French Lescot.

References

External links

Villages in Essex
Maldon District